The Verdun Junior Canadiens were a junior ice hockey team in the Quebec Major Junior Hockey League (QMJHL) from 1984 to 1989. They played home games at the Verdun Auditorium, and won the President's Cup during the 1984–85 QMJHL season.

History
Yvon Lambert was named the team's head coach for the 1984–85 QMJHL season. He resigned on March 8, 1985, with five games remaining, because he said "it was too difficult for him to motivate amateur-level players". Jean Bégin was named head coach for the final five games of the season and the playoffs. The team that season included future NHL players Claude Lemieux, Jimmy Carson, Gerry Fleming, Shane MacEachern, and Everett Sanipass.

Bégin led Verdun to three wins in the remainder of the regular season, and a first-place finish in the Lebel Division. In the playoffs, Verdun defeated the Hull Olympiques four games to one in the first round, then defeated the Shawinigan Cataractes four games to one in the second round, and defeated the Chicoutimi Saguenéens in four consecutive games to win the President's Cup. Claude Lemieux led the league in playoffs scoring 23 goals, and 40 points. Verdun's games in the 1985 Memorial Cup were played in Drummondville, Quebec. Verdun lost 6-3 to the Sault Ste. Marie Greyhounds in game one, lost 5-3 to the Prince Albert Raiders in game two, and lost 5-1 to the Shawinigan Cataractes in game three.

Two seasons later the Junior Canadiens began three consecutive seasons placing last in the QMJHL. The team was sold after the 1988–89 season, becoming the Saint-Hyacinthe Laser.

Players
Claude Lemieux was awarded the Guy Lafleur Trophy as the most valuable player in the 1985 playoffs. Jimmy Carson won two awards during the 1984–85 season. He won the Michel Bergeron Trophy as the offensive rookie-of-the-year, and the Michael Bossy Trophy as the best professional prospect. Carson won the Frank J. Selke Memorial Trophy as most sportsmanlike player during the 1985–86 season.

NHL alumni

Yearly results
Regular season and playoffs results:

Regular season

Playoffs
1984–85 Defeated Hull Olympiques 4 games to 1 in quarter-finals.Defeated Shawinigan Cataractes 4 games to 1 in semi-finals.Defeated Chicoutimi Saguenéens 4 games to 0 in finals. QMJHL CHAMPIONS Finished winless at 1984 Memorial Cup tournament.
1985–86 Lost to Saint-Jean Castors 5 games to 0 in quarter-finals. 
1986–87 Out of playoffs.  
1987–88 Out of playoffs.   
1988–89 Out of playoffs.

References

1984 establishments in Quebec
1989 disestablishments in Quebec
Defunct Quebec Major Junior Hockey League teams
Ice hockey teams in Montreal
Ice hockey clubs established in 1984
Sports clubs disestablished in 1989
Verdun, Quebec